Alexander Chaplin (né Gaberman; born March 20, 1971) is an American actor. Chaplin's most prominent role was that of speechwriter James Hobert on the sitcom Spin City.

As with the rest of the Spin City main cast, Chaplin has featured in creator Bill Lawrence's subsequent sitcom, Scrubs, playing a drug addict who tries to trick Elliot into giving him prescription medication in "My Moment of Un-Truth" and later tricks Jordan into giving him money in "My Rite of Passage". His character later appeared in "My Scrubs" as a drugs counsellor for the hospital, claiming to be reformed.

Personal life
Chaplin is the son of a jazz musician and a novelist. As a teen, Chaplin attended Stagedoor Manor Performing Arts Training Center in upstate New York. He and his wife, Daisy, producer Harold Prince's daughter, changed their surnames to Chaplin, his mother-in-law's maiden name.

Filmography

Film

Television

References

External links
 

1971 births
Living people
Male actors from New York City
American male film actors
American male television actors
20th-century American male actors
21st-century American male actors